Hard target can refer to:

Hard Target, a 1993 American action film.
A defended target (in relation to a security threat); the opposite of a soft target